Empire Crossbill was a   Design 1013 cargo ship that was completed in 1919 by Los Angeles Shipbuilding & Drydock Company, San Pedro, California, United States for the United States Shipping Board (USSB).

Description 
The ship was built in 1919 by Los Angeles Shipbuilding & Drydock Company, San Pedro, California. She was Yard Number 11.

Her DWT was 6,800.

The engine was built by Los Angeles Shipbuilding & Drydock Corporation.

History 
West Amargosa was built for the USSB. She was completed in March 1919, The United States Official Number 217631 and Code Letters LQBW were allocated. West Amargosa was chartered by United American Lines until 1921, operating the Plymouth – Gibraltar – Tunis – New York route. With the change of Code Letters in 1934, she was allocated KLCP. In 1937, she was transferred to the USMC and laid up as part of the reserve fleet.

In 1940, West Amargosa was transferred to the MoWT. She was initially operated under the management of Sir W. Reardon Smith & Sons. Management was later transferred to John Morrison & Co Ltd, Newcastle-upon-Tyne. West Amargosa was due to join Convoy HX 119, which departed from Halifax, Nova Scotia, Canada on 6 April 1941 and arrived at Liverpool, Lancashire on 22 April. She was recorded as carrying a cargo of scrap iron bound for Middlesbrough, Yorkshire. Instead, she joined Convoy SC 28, which departed from Halifax on 9 April and arrived at Liverpool on 28 April. Her destination was now given as West Hartlepool, Co Durham. She left the convoy at the Clyde, joining Convoy WN 228, which departed the Clyde on 1 May and arrived at Methil, Fife on 5 May.

West Amargosa was renamed Empire Crossbill. She was allocated the United Kingdom Official Number 168177 and Code Letters MLNP. Her port of registry was London. She departed Middlesbrough on 30 May for the Tyne, returning to Middlesbrough on 2 June and departing the same day for the Tyne again. On 10 June, she joined Convoy EC 31, which had departed from Southend, Essex on 9 June and arrived at Loch Ewe on 14 June. She then joined Convoy OB 334, which departed from Liverpool on 11 June and arrived at Halifax on 25 June. She left the convoy at St John's, Newfoundland on 24 June. Empire Crossbill departed St. John's that day for Philadelphia, Pennsylvania, United States, arriving on 2 July.

Empire Crossbill departed Philadelphia on 22 August for Halifax, where she arrived on 25 August, departing the same day for Sydney, Cape Breton, Canada. Empire Crossbill was a member of Convoy SC 42, which departed Sydney on 30 August 1941 and arrived at Liverpool on 15 September. She was stated to be carrying 6,686 tons of steel and four tons of relief goods, although it is also stated that she was carrying a cargo of explosives. All 38 crew, ten DEMS gunners and her single passenger were killed. Those lost on Empire Crossbill are commemorated at the Tower Hill Memorial, London.

References

External links 

1918 ships
Ships built in Los Angeles
Steamships of the United States
Merchant ships of the United States
Design 1013 ships
Design 1013 ships of the Ministry of War Transport
Empire ships
Steamships of the United Kingdom
Maritime incidents in September 1941
World War II shipwrecks in the Atlantic Ocean
Ships sunk by German submarines in World War II